Bahali is a village and union council (an administrative subdivision) of the Mansehra District in Khyber-Pakhtunkhwa province of Pakistan. Bahali is part of Mansehra Tehsil and is located at the boundary area of the Mansehra district and the Abbottabad district, west from the Karakurram highway at Qalanderabad. It is a valley surrounded by mountains. It is inhabited by Turki, Tanolies, Awan, Gujjar, Syeds And Galye.

Etymology

Behali is actually a distortion of the word Bahali, which means "restoration." Tradition holds that the reason the village was named Bahali was due to its successive destruction by various tribes and Sikhs and its final restoration by Karlugh Turks, descendants of the former rulers of Pakhli Sarkar. These Karlugh Turks are still one of the influential tribes in the Hazara area.

History

After the fall and disintegration of the Turkic Pakhli Sarkar, the Turks continued to hold sway in certain areas between Sherwan and Mangal till the arrival of the Sikhs in 1817-18. They were deprived of further areas during the 1872 settlement. Under the settlement, they continued to possess about 30,000 kanals, equivalent to 7,500 acres (30 km2) of lands between RichhBehn Abbottabad and Bahali Mansehra. The Turks constructed a fort between Kakot and Shahkot, called the Mochikot fort. This fort proved to be a very strong place of resistance for Turks because of its hilltop location surrounded by Mangal river from three sides.

Rehabilitation

Raja Asalat Khan was the first person who settled in Behali in around 1795. However, the Turks were dislodged from Behali by the Sikh Empire in 1817. These Bahali Turks migrated to Kashmir and stayed with their relatives in Thangar Shawai Turkan. After Hari Singh Nalwa invited them back to resettle in Behali, they finally returned around 8 years later. Disputes developed again with the Sikh Khalsa Raj and the Behali Turks who took asylum in the Mochikot fort. Raja Asalat passed his last days in Richhbehn. He is buried in Sohlan Bala near Kot-reen graveyard. Raja Paras Khan, with the help of his brother Raja Maazullah Khan, established control over the jageer on strong footing and started residing permanently in Behali. Rule by the Sarkar-i Khalsa was resented by the Behali Turkic elders, who then colluded with the British East India Company to subvert the Sikh leadership, which was then replaced by a British administration until independence.

Besides Turks, some other tribes also reside in Behali such as Gujjar, Tanolis, Syed, Swati, and Awan. Previously, Raja Masood ur Reman (Turk) was UC Nazim and now the position is held by Muhammad Afsar Niazi (Tanoli). After devolution, the first Nazim was Ghulam Mustafa (Gujjar).

People are highly educated and the majority of them prefer government jobs and there is a sizable a number of high ranking officers in judiciary, police, civil service, air-force, army, navy, education, health, and forest, etc. The literacy rate is quite high among the male population and now also increasing among female day by day. The primary school in Behali was first established in 1872. Now there is a network of public and private sector schools in UC Behali. The crime rate is almost negligible, as residents are generally peaceful and non-violent barring a few isolated incidents.

References

See also
 Imperial Gazetteer of India, volume 
 Behali Ki Tareekh by Raja Khursheed
 Ain-e-Akbari
 Tareekh e Farishta
 Land Revenue Record

Union councils of Mansehra District
Populated places in Mansehra District